Nordhausen I is an electoral constituency (German: Wahlkreis) represented in the Landtag of Thuringia. It elects one member via first-past-the-post voting. Under the current constituency numbering system, it is designated as constituency 3. It comprises the entirety of the district of Nordhausen with the exception of the city of Nordhausen, which compromises the constituency of Nordhausen II.

Nordhausen I was created in 1990 for the first state election. Since 2019, it has been represented by Birgit Keller of The Left.

Geography
As of the 2019 state election, Nordhausen I covers the entirety of the Nordhausen district except for the city of Nordhausen. It comprises the municipalities of Bleicherode, Ellrich, Görsbach, Großlohra, Harztor, Heringen/Helme, Hohenstein, Kehmstedt, Kleinfurra, Lipprechterode, Niedergebra, Sollstedt, Urbach, Werther, and the village of Buchholz (since 2018 part of Nordhausen municipality).

Members
The constituency was held by the Christian Democratic Union (CDU) from its creation in 1990 until 2019, during which time it was represented by Klaus Zeh (1990–1994) and Egon Primas (1994–2019). It was won by The Left in 2019, and is represented by Birgit Keller.

Election results

2019 election

2014 election

2009 election

2004 election

1999 election

1994 election

1990 election

References

Electoral districts in Thuringia
Nordhausen (district)
1990 establishments in Germany
Constituencies established in 1990